Parris Afton Bonds is an American historical romantic fiction novelist. She is the co-founder of Romance Writers of America.

Bonds started her professional writing career in the early 1970s with her first sale to Modern Secretary magazine, and in 1981 Time magazine called Bonds one of the many women who supplement their family income by writing romance novels. Her predominant genre is historical romance, but her works include other genres such as westerns, murder mysteries, sagas, and international thrillers. Bonds is a regular on bestseller lists and has been published in more than a dozen languages. ABC's Nightline heralded her as one of the three bestselling authors of romantic fiction in America.

She co-founded both Romance Writers of America, of which she was the first Vice President, and Southwest Writers Workshop. The Parris Award was established in her name by the Southwest Writers Workshop to honor published writers who give outstandingly of their time and talent to other writers. She has donated her time, teaching creative writing to female inmates and school children, both of whom she considers her captive audiences.

Bonds is named after Paris, Kentucky, where she was conceived, and the River Afton in Scotland. She was born in Tampa, Florida, and grew up in Oak Cliff, outside Dallas, Texas. Legendary Locals of Oak Cliff features Bonds in its chapter, "Creative Legends and Locals."

She is the author of more than fifty books and the mother of five sons, two of whom were born In Mexico City, where she lived in the early 1970s. Currently, she resides in Querétaro, Mexico. Writers who influenced Bonds early on were Dorothy Dunnett, Rafael Sabatini, Sergeanne Golan, Frank Yerby, Daphne du Maurier, Samuel Shellabarger, Jan Westcott, and Edna Ferber.

Works
A list of some of the works by Parris Afton Bonds.

Books
 Blue Bayou - 1986 / (Fawcett) / 
 Blue Moon - 1985 / (Ballantine) / 
 The Calling of the Clan - 2016 / (Paradise Publishing) / ASIN B01N660FWI
 The Captive - 2013 / (Paradise Publishing) / ASIN B00GQ0BN22
 Dancing with Crazy Woman - 2013 / (Paradise Publishing) / ASIN B00C2C1RNI
 Dancing with Wild Woman - 2013 / (Paradise Publishing) / ASIN B007C7WOPI
 Deep Purple - 1984 / (Fawcett) / 
 Dream Keeper - 2014 / (Paradise Publishing) / ASIN B00KC52J4S
 Dream Time - 2014 / (Paradise Publishing) / ASIN B00K8O8FKU
 Dust Devil - 2013 / (Paradise Publishing) / ASIN B00C53PH76
 The Flash Of The Firefly - 2013 / (Paradise Publishing) / ASIN B00CWI33O8
 For All Time - 1992 / (HarperCollins) / 
 Indian Affairs - 2013 / (Paradise Publishing) / ASIN B008JLF4U8
 Kingdom Come: Temptation - 2013 / (Paradise Publishing) / ASIN B00H9VCJG6
 Kingdom Come: Trespass - 2015 / (Paradise Publishing) / ASIN B00S8G0WWO
 Lavender Blue - 1983 / (Paradise Publishing) / ASIN B00GLEXN58
 Love Tide - 1980 / (Popular Library) / 
 Made For Each Other - 2013 / (Paradise Publishing) / ASIN B007Y0694U
 Man For Hire: Book II - Midsummer Madness Trilogy - 2013 / (Paradise Publishing) / ASIN B00LVI15HW
 Midsummer Midnight - October 1985 / (HarperCollins) / 
 Mood Indigo - 1988 / (Fawcett) / 
 No Telling - 2014 / (Paradise Publishing) / ASIN B00OFHDSG2
 Renegade Man - 2013 / (Paradise Publishing) / ASIN B007Y0688M
 Run To Me - 2013 / (Paradise Publishing) / ASIN B007QEA8FK
 Savage Enchantment - 1979 / (Popular Library) / 
 The Savage - 1995 / (Dorchester) / 
 Snow And Ice - 1987 / (Paradise Publishing) / ASIN B00RSIDPNG
 Spinster's Song - 1992 / (Leisure Books) / 
 Stardust - 1983 / (Paradise Publishing) / ASIN B00T5IW006
 Sweet Enchantress - 2013 / (Paradise Publishing) / ASIN B00HIR06X4
 Sweet Golden Sun - 1978 / (Popular Library) / 
 The Wildest Heart - 2014 / (Paradise Publishing) / ASIN B00NKQ9VCY
 Wanted Woman - 1987 / (HarperCollins) / 
 Widow Woman - 2013 / (Paradise Publishing) / ASIN B007SXUT80
 Wind Song'' - 2013 / (Paradise Publishing) / ASIN B007R8UUGW

Novellas and anthologies 
 "Written in the Stars" in Valentine Sampler - Anthology|Valentine Sampler - 1993 / (Leisure Books) / 
 "Ravished!" in Silhouette Summer Sizzlers - Anthology|Silhouette Summer Sizzlers - 1989 / (HarperCollins) /  
 "At First Sight: A Novella" - 2017 / (Paradise Publishing) / ASIN B06XTHWC4V
 "The Latest and the Greatest" - 2014 / (Paradise Publishing) / ASIN B00OMENP66

References

Living people
American historical novelists
Year of birth missing (living people)